Simyo is a brand for various mobile virtual network operators (MVNOs) in Europe. In the Netherlands, it is owned by KPN. In Spain, it is owned by Orange España.

The brand previously was active in France (owned by Bouygues, discontinued in 2015), in Germany (owned by Telefonica, discontinued in 2016, replaced by Blau), and Belgium (owned by KPN, discontinued in 2017).

History

The company was founded in May 2005 as a joint-venture with E-Plus. Its headquarters are in Düsseldorf led by Nicolas Biagosch, the current CEO. The success of the pioneer Tchibo late 2004 (in a 50-50 cooperation with O2) and Simyo's entry into the German mobile telephony market in early 2005 were followed by several similar offers from other low-cost providers around mid-2005 resulting in a general price decline in the German mobile market.

The German provider Mobilcom first tried to stop Simyo with an injunction, as E-Plus hadn't granted the same conditions to other providers and hadn't given sufficient notice about the start of the mobile offering. The Federal Network Agency decided this case on 12 July 2005 in favor of Simyo, and justified this by saying that:
"The simyo offer was not simply a new tariff, but a new product. In light of its commercial, technical and marketing philosophy which has renounced costly, hitherto widely found features, it differed in essential details from conventional prepaid products."

In Germany, it was marketed with the slogan "Weil Einfach einfach einfach ist.", notable for its word repetition. It roughly translates into "because simple is simply simple" or "because easy is simply easy".

On 3 January 2007, E-Plus announced the complete takeover of Simyo. Simyo does not own a wireless network but, as an MVNO, uses the network infrastructure of its parent company. In May 2010, Nicolas Biagosch took over as CEO from Rolf Hansen. Simyo is part of the E-Plus Group which has 22.7 million subscribers (Dec 2011).

Simyo belongs to the Dutch telecommunications group KPN, after acquisition of the remainder of E-Plus on March 14. 2002. In Spain, Simyo has been operating under the trade name of Simyo as an MVNO since January 29, 2008 through the Orange network. KPN sold its stake in Simyo France on December 22, 2011  to Bouygues Telecom, KPN's main mobile partner in France. KPN lost control of the German Simyo operations in 2014 when it sold E-Plus to Telefonica, although it retained a financial investment in Telefónica Germany.

Simyo bases its business strategy on "Self-management via the Internet", using a model similar to that originally made popular by online banks. This business structure permits considerable cost savings, which the operator passes on in its rates. Another aspect that helps to cut costs is that they do not subsidise handsets.

Simyo Nederland
Simyo Nederland acquired customers from Debitel (October 23, 2008) and Tringg (May 14, 2011) when KPN acquired these stakes in the Netherlands.

References

External links
Simyo Netherlands
Simyo Spain

KPN
Mobile virtual network operators
Mobile phone companies of the Netherlands
Mobile phone companies of Belgium
Mobile phone companies of Germany
Mobile phone companies of Spain
Dutch brands
Telecommunications companies established in 2005